Sar Kashkamir (also Romanized as Sar Kashkamīr; also known as Kashkamīr-e Bālā, Kashkamīr-e ‘Olyā, Kashkamīr ‘Uliya, and Kashkeh Mīr-e Bālā) is a village in Kivanat Rural District, Kolyai District, Sonqor County, Kermanshah Province, Iran. At the 2006 census, its population was 136, in 27 families.

References 

Populated places in Sonqor County